The North Dakota Museum of Art (NDMOA) is the official art museum of the American state of North Dakota. Located on the campus of the University of North Dakota (UND) in Grand Forks, North Dakota, the museum is a private not-for-profit institution. The building includes three exhibition galleries, a video information room, cafe, and gift shop. Admission is free.

History
The museum was formed in the 1970s as the University of North Dakota Art Galleries.

In 1981, the North Dakota Legislative Assembly designated the museum as the state's official art museum and the museum took on its present name. The 1907 West Gymnasium on the UND campus was remodeled and, in 1989, the  structure became the new home for the museum. Facilities in the museum have been designed by artists who have worked with the museum in the past, including the gift shop and donor wall, created by New York artist Barton Lidice Beneš, who constructed the donor wall similar to his own shadow box museums, and the outdoor sculpture garden created by Richard Nonas (Nonas article is in French language). The museum finished a significant renovation project that included installation of skylights, new flooring, and windows.

Permanent collection 
The museum's permanent collection includes works by María Magdalena Campos Pons, Aganetha Dyck, Rena Effendi, Walter Piehl, and Kiki Smith.

Exhibits
The museum features changing exhibitions from regional, national, and international contemporary artists. Exhibits from the past have included:

 Bugs and Such
 Lewis and Clark: Rivers, Edens, Empires
 The Plains of Sweet Regret
 Under the Whelming Tide: The 1997 Flood of the Red River of the North

Since 2013, the museum has hosted an exhibit of the reconstruction of artist Barton Beneš's New York City apartment called Barton's Place.

Other past exhibitions include:

2014 

 Arnold Saper: A Face to Paint
 Songs for Spirit Lake
 Mary Bonkemeyer: Decades in Paint
 Robert Rauschenberg: Four Decades of Work on Paper
 Fractured: North Dakota's Oil Boom

2015 

 An African Affair
 Micah Bloom: Codex
 Colorprint U.S.A.
 Armando Ramos: Something Absurd
 Jill Brody: Hidden in Plain Sight
 Fred Liang: A Bubble in a Stream

2016 

 Rick Bartow: Things I Know, But Cannot Explain
 Allison Leigh Holt: The Glass System
 In Our Own Words: Native Impressions
 Justin Sorensen: Stalking the Snow Leopard
 Kim Fink: Changing Nature
 Songs for Spirit Lake – Part II

Musical concert series 
Musical concert series include:
 Sunday Concerts in the Gallery Series (October to April)
 Concerts in the Garden (July and August)
 NDMOA Downtown at the Empire Arts Center

Outreach 
Outreach programs include Summer Kid's Art Camps, Family Days At The Museum, adult classes, rural arts program, and touring exhibits.

See also

 List of art museums
 List of museums in North Dakota

References

External links
 , the museum's official website

Museums with year of establishment missing
1970s establishments in North Dakota
Art museums and galleries in North Dakota
Arts organizations established in the 1970s
Buildings and structures in Grand Forks, North Dakota
Museums in Grand Forks County, North Dakota
Non-profit organizations based in the United States
Tourist attractions in Grand Forks, North Dakota
University museums in North Dakota
University of North Dakota